David Alonso Gómez (born 25 April 2006) is a Colombian motorcycle racer who currently competes for the Gas Gas Aspar Team in the Moto3 World Championship. He won the European Talent Cup in 2020 and the Red Bull MotoGP Rookies Cup in 2021.

Career

Early career
Alonso won the European Talent Cup in 2020. The following year, he won the 2021 Red Bull MotoGP Rookies Cup. He clinched that championship when he finished third in the first race of the Aragón round on 11 September.

Moto3 World Championship
Alonso was signed by the Gas Gas Aspar Team and made his Moto3 debut at the 2021 Emilia Romagna motorcycle Grand Prix as a replacement for Sergio García who was injured in the previous round. The following season, he made his second start at the Portuguese round as a wildcard rider. He will make his full season debut in the 2023 Moto3 World Championship.

Career statistics

Grand Prix motorcycle racing

By season

By class

Races by year
(key) (Races in bold indicate pole position; races in italics indicate fastest lap)

References

External links
 

2006 births
Living people
Sportspeople from Madrid
Colombian motorcycle racers
Moto3 World Championship riders
21st-century Colombian people